A pan-European automated clearing house (PE-ACH) is a clearing house that is able to settle SEPA compliant credit transfers and direct debits across the Eurozone.

At present there is only one PE-ACH in operation – STEP2 – which was established by the Euro Banking Association in April 2003. According to a survey done by Equens, in the future PE-ACH might be less relevant as banks will settle their transactions via multiple clearing houses rather than using one central clearing house.

Payment networks
Banking technology
Banking in the European Union
Eurozone
Payment clearing systems